Feet of Clay is a 2007 short film directed by Carrie Preston and produced by Daisy 3 Pictures.

Feet of Clay was written by David Caudle, and was first produced in 2005 as a play for the Samuel French Festival at the Chernuchin Theatre in New York City.

Premise
Vaughn (Steven McElroy), a heterosexual man, confesses his sexual obsession for the feet of his best friend, Clay (John G. Preston).

References

American LGBT-related short films
2007 LGBT-related films
2007 films
Films directed by Carrie Preston
2007 short films
2000s English-language films
2000s American films